The Albanian Air Force ( - Air Force of the Republic of Albania) is the air force of Albania and one of the branches of the Albanian Armed Forces.

History

Early history

In 1914 the government of Albania ordered three Lohner Daimler aircraft from Austria to form an air force. As a result of the outbreak of World War I, the order was cancelled. Albania did not have the resources to start the development of a proper Air Force during the 1920s and 1930s. After the establishment of the Albanian Kingdom in 1928, King Zog formed the Royal Albanian Air Corps under the direction of the Royal Albanian Army.

The Royal Air Force, and the rest of Albanian armed forces, were abolished following the Italian invasion of Albania during the Second World War.

Socialist Albania
On 24 April 1951, following the end of the Second World War, Albania re-established its air force.

An academy was founded in Vlorë in 1962. Albania cut diplomatic ties with the Soviet Union in 1962, leading to a shift to China for the supply of necessary parts to maintain its MiGs.

After World War II, the Albanian Air Force finally came into existence when Albania was equipped with Soviet aircraft. The first squadron was equipped with Yakovlev Yak-9s. The first jet fighter to enter service was the MiG-15, dating officially 15 May 1955, followed by the MiG-17. Some of the MiG-15s were Soviet fighters used and then withdrawn from the North Korean Air Force. The backbone of the Albanian Air Force jet fighters became MiG-19 (NATO code "Farmer"). 12 MiG-19PM were delivered by the USSR in October 1959 and on the same year pilots and specialists were sent in USSR to train with the all-weather interceptor MiG-19 PM. After the collapse of USSR-Albanian relations, significant numbers of Shenyang J-6 fighters (Chinese copy of the MiG-19S), were acquired from China. In the early 1970s, Albania exchanged its lot of Soviet-made MiG-19PM (NATO code "Farmer-E") fighters equipped for beam-riding missiles, with 12, more advanced, Chengdu J-7A fighters (Chinese copy of the Soviet-built MiG-21). Two of them were lost in incidents in the early 1970s, eight had problems with lack of batteries in the early 1980s.

In total, during the 70s and early 80s, the Albanian Air Force was able to deploy 142 aircraft, between Shenyang J-6Cs, 12 Chengdu J-7As, a fighter squadron equipped with MiG-17s, a considerable number of MiG-15 (both BIS and UTI versions), and 4 Soviet-made Il-14 transport aircraft. A squadron of Shijiazhuang Y-5 was deployed in Tirana and the Air Force Academy in Vlora had 2 squadrons of Yak-18 for basic pilot training purposes. The helicopter component consisted in 18 Harbin Z-5 (Chinese copy of Mil Mi-4) helicopters based in Farka Tirana, meanwhile there was a single prototype of a light H-5 bomber based in Rinas.

Due to the collapse of relations between Albania and the Chinese, maintenance became extremely difficult and the number of deadly incidents involving Mikoyan fighters increased. Despite Albanian efforts and some initial success in repairing the engines of the MiGs, the lack of specific jet fuel forced authorities to start production locally, resulting in low-quality production (the first attempt was in 1961, when the Kuçova factory produced the special jet kerosene called TSI). The fuel shortened the lifespan of the jet engines and was often blamed as the main reason for several deadly incidents. 35 Albanian pilots lost their lives from 1955 to 2005, mainly due to MiG mechanical failures.

Recent history
Following the fall of communism in Albania in 1990, the air force had 200 jets and 40 helicopters, and four Il-14 transport planes. During the 1997 uprising in Albania, seven MiGs were destroyed and their parts were stolen.  In the early 90s, in an effort to keep the MiGs flying, the Albanian Air Force received spare parts from Bulgaria and engines from the ex-GDR. By 2004, Albania still had 117 J-6C aircraft, although mostly were not operational and only 12 Chengdu J-7A. The Albanian fighter jets were finally withdrawn from active service in late 2004 after the last deadly incident involving a J-6C during take-off from the military area at Mother Teresa Airport in Tirana.

In the early 1990s, 7594 Regiment became Aviation Regiment 4020, seemingly with its 1st Squadron of fighter aircraft and 2nd Squadron of FT-5s, and Y-5s (Antonov An-2s).

By 2006, Albania had scrapped over half of its Z-5s and had signed a contract for the delivery of six Bolkow 105s over three years. This acquisition allowed air force to operate with 4 Y-5s, 7 B206s, 3 B205s, 6 Bolkow 105s. Currently, the Albanian Air Brigade does not operate any Soviet-era aircraft. Since 2011, 9 Shijiazhuang Y-5 have been retired from service. In 2011, the air force sold four Il-14 transport planes for scrap.

In 2016, 40 retired Albanian military aircraft were prepared for auction at a future date. The aircraft for sale include a military trainer aircraft, the Yak-18, and four types of military jets – MiG-15s, MiG-17s, MiG-19s, and MiG-21s – and four Mi-4 transport helicopters. The government said there has been interest from collectors and museums, and that it will sell another 100 jets if the auction is successful. The funds generated will be used to further modernise the Air Force.

Aircraft

Current inventory 
The Albanian Air Force has retired all of its fixed wing aircraft and now operates several types of helicopters.

Retired aircraft 
All Albanian fixed-wing aircraft were withdrawn from active service in 2005.

Structure 

The air force's headquarters is located in Tirana and it operates three airbases: Tirana Air Base with the national Control and Reporting Centre, which reports to NATO's Integrated Air Defense System CAOC Torrejón in Spain, Kuçovë Air Base, and Lapraka Air Base, home to the government's transport helicopters.

 Head Quarters - Tirana
 Staff Support Company - Tirana
 Helicopter Squadron- Farka Air Base  
  Support - Kucove Air Base
 Air Surveillance Centre, in Rinas reports to NATO Integrated Air Defense System's CAOC Torrejón at Torrejón Air Base in Spain
 Military Meteorological Service - Tirana
 Automated weather stations in Farkë, Gjadër, Kuçovë, Kukës, Vlorë, and Gjirokastër

Officer ranks

Other ranks

Roundels

See also 
 List of Albanian Air Force aircraft
Albanian Armed Forces
 Albanian Land Force
 Albanian Naval Force

References

External links 

 Albanian Armed Forces
 Eastern Orbat, Albanian Air Force 1988
 Aeroflight, World Air Forces - Albania, last revised 8 June 2006

Albania
Air Force
Air Force